On May 1, 2004, the body of Alonzo Brooks was found in La Cygne, Kansas, about a month after he was reported missing after April 3, 2004. The circumstances surrounding Brooks's death are mysterious, and the Federal Bureau of Investigation continues to investigate whether or not he was a victim of a hate crime. On April 5, 2021, the FBI announced that their investigation had proved that Brooks' death was a homicide.

Background
Alonzo Tyree Brooks was born on May 19, 1980, to Billy Brooks Sr. and Maria Ramirez. A native of Topeka, Kansas, Brooks was of African American and Mexican descent. At the time of his disappearance, he was 23 years old and working as a custodian for Countryside Maintenance in Gardner, Kansas.

Disappearance
While at the party, racial slurs were allegedly uttered toward Brooks, possibly igniting tension between Brooks and the other individuals. As the party continued, Brooks's friends left the party at La Cygne at different times, accidentally leaving Brooks behind due to a perceived misunderstanding on how he would be getting a ride home to Gardner. The next day Brooks did not return to Gardner and was deemed to be missing.

Investigation
Following the night of the party, the Brooks family traveled to La Cygne to search for their son and contact the local authorities. Eventually, the Linn County Police Department turned the case over to the Kansas Bureau of Investigation after failing to locate Brooks. Both the KBI and FBI were unsuccessful in locating Brooks.

On May 1, 2004, the Brooks family was allowed to search the property for their son. On the first day of the search effort, Brooks' body was found on the banks of Middle Creek adjacent to the house where he was last seen a month earlier. Postmortem examination indicated that Brooks did not have any broken bones, any signs of blunt force trauma or injury, nor any of the biological signs of drowning in his lungs. Consequently, the pathologist could not determine a cause of death.

Numerous theories have been offered as to how Brooks died. Witnesses recalled flirtation between Brooks and a white woman later on at the party, prompting theories of a hate crime motive.

On June 11, 2020, the FBI reopened the cold case and issued a $100,000 reward for information related to Brooks' death.

FBI determines homicide
Brooks's body was exhumed in July 2020 and transported to Dover Air Force Base for an autopsy and further investigation by the Armed Forces Medical Examiner. The examiner concluded in their report that Brooks's death was due to homicide.

Acting U.S. Attorney Duston Slinkard stated that while the FBI knew that Brooks died under very suspicious circumstances, the autopsy ultimately proved that his death was not an accident. Additionally, Slinkard stated that the FBI is doing everything that they can and that they will spare no resources in order to bring justice to those who were responsible for Brooks' death. In the autopsy, examiners stated that there were injuries that would not be consistent with decomposition.

Media
On July 1, 2020, Brooks' death was featured in the fourth episode "No Ride Home" of the fifteenth season of Unsolved Mysteries TV series. On November 16, 2020, Unsolved Mysteries stated the FBI had learned of a second party in La Cygne the night Alonzo Brooks disappeared. Attendees left the party after a fight broke out, then headed to the farmhouse where Alonzo was last seen.

See also
 List of solved missing person cases
 List of unsolved deaths
 Deaths of Arnold Archambeau and Ruby Bruguier, South Dakota couple's bodies found in 1993 near where they had disappeared from following a car accident three months earlier; cause of death determined to be exposure but police believe they died elsewhere and the bodies were moved back there.

References

2000s in Kansas
2000s missing person cases
2004 controversies
2004 deaths
2004 in Kansas
African-American history of Kansas
African-American-related controversies
Black Lives Matter
Deaths by person in Kansas
Formerly missing people
Law enforcement in Kansas
Linn County, Kansas
May 2004 events in the United States
Missing person cases in Kansas (state)
Race and crime in the United States
Unsolved murders in the United States